David del Pozo Guillén (born 5 June 1997) is a Spanish footballer who plays as a central midfielder for Racing de Ferrol.

Club career
Born in Getafe, Community of Madrid, del Pozo joined Getafe CF's youth setup at the age of six. On 1 May 2015, aged 17, he made his senior debut with the reserves at the age of 17 by starting in a 0–1 Segunda División B home loss against SD Amorebieta.

Del Pozo scored his first senior goal on 23 October 2016, netting the game's only in a home success over AD Unión Adarve. He became a regular starter for the B's in the 2017–18 season, scoring seven goals as his side narrowly missed out promotion.

On 2 July 2018, del Pozo signed for CDA Navalcarnero in the third tier. On 10 July of the following year, he moved to fellow league team Internacional de Madrid.

On 5 August 2020, del Pozo agreed to a two-year contract with Albacete Balompié in Segunda División. He made his professional debut on 12 September, coming on as a half-time substitute for Eddy Silvestre in a 0–3 away loss against RCD Espanyol.

On 22 January 2021, after being rarely used, del Pozo was loaned to third division side Las Rozas CF until the end of the season.

References

External links

1997 births
Living people
People from Getafe
Spanish footballers
Footballers from the Community of Madrid
Association football midfielders
Segunda División players
Primera Federación players
Segunda División B players
Tercera División players
Getafe CF B players
CDA Navalcarnero players
Internacional de Madrid players
Albacete Balompié players
Las Rozas CF players
Racing de Ferrol footballers